Genish may refer to:

People
Gal Genish (born 1991), Israeli footballer
Lior Genish is a former Israeli footballer who played in Maccabi Netanya.
Sharon Ganish (sometimes Genish) (born 1983), Israeli-American model